This is a list of some important mountain passes in the Rocky Mountains of the U.S. State of Colorado.


Mountain passes and highway summits traversed by improved roads

Mountain summit highways

Mountain passes traversed by unimproved roads

Mountain passes traversed by foot trails

See also

Colorado
Bibliography of Colorado
Index of Colorado-related articles
Outline of Colorado
Colorado statistical areas
Geography of Colorado
History of Colorado
List of counties in Colorado
List of places in Colorado
List of mountain peaks of Colorado
List of mountain ranges of Colorado
List of populated places in Colorado
List of census-designated places in Colorado
List of county seats in Colorado
List of forts in Colorado
List of ghost towns in Colorado
List of historic places in Colorado
List of municipalities in Colorado
List of post offices in Colorado
List of rivers of Colorado
List of protected areas of Colorado

Notes

References

External links

Colorado state government website
Colorado tourism website
History Colorado website
Colorado highway conditions
Colorado elevations
Bicycling Colorado's Mountain Passes
Pass Bagger

 
Colorado transportation-related lists
Lists of landforms of Colorado
Colorado, List of mountain passes in